Plœuc-l'Hermitage is a commune in the Côtes-d'Armor department of western France. The municipality was established on 1 January 2016 and consists of the former communes of Plœuc-sur-Lié and L'Hermitage-Lorge.

Geography

Climate
Plœuc-l'Hermitage has a oceanic climate (Köppen climate classification Cfb).

Population

See also 
Communes of the Côtes-d'Armor department

References 

Ploeuclhermitage

Communes nouvelles of Côtes-d'Armor
Populated places established in 2016
2016 establishments in France